The 1987 Jason 2000 Classic was a women's tennis tournament played on grass courts at the Milton Tennis Centre in Brisbane, Australia and was part of the Category 2 tier of the 1987 Virginia Slims World Championship Series. It was the inaugural edition of the tournament and was held from 29 December 1986 through 4 January 1987. First-seeded Hana Mandlíková won the singles title.

Finals

Singles
 Hana Mandlíková defeated  Pam Shriver 6–2, 2–6, 6–4
 It was Mandlíková's 1st singles title of the year and the 25th of her career.

Doubles
 Hana Mandlíková /  Wendy Turnbull defeated  Betsy Nagelsen /  Elizabeth Smylie 6–4, 6–2
 It was Mandlíková's 1st doubles title of the year and the 15th of her career. It was Turnbull's 1st doubles title of the year and the 52nd of her career.

References

External links
 ITF tournament edition details
 Tournament draws

Jason 2000 Classic
Danone Hardcourt Championships
Jason 2000 Classic
Jason 2000 Classic, 1987
Jason 2000 Classic
Jason 2000 Classic
Sports competitions in Brisbane
Tennis in Queensland